Fire resistance may refer to:

 Fire resistance (ecology), a quality of plants that are harmed but not killed by fire
 Fire retardant, a substance used to slow down or stop the spread of fire or reduce its intensity
 Fireproofing, a passive fire protection method
 Fire-resistance rating, an indication of the ability for a passive fire protection system to withstand a standard fire resistance test
 Flame retardant,  chemicals added to manufactured materials
 Fire-retardant fabric